Hot Buttered Soul is the second studio album by American soul musician Isaac Hayes. Released in 1969, it is recognized as a landmark in soul music. Recorded with The Bar-Kays, the album features four lengthy tracks, including a 12-minute version of the Burt Bacharach/Hal David cover "Walk On By" and an almost 19-minute long version of Jimmy Webb's "By the Time I Get to Phoenix"; both songs were edited significantly and released as a double A-side single in July 1969.

Background
Hayes' 1968 solo debut, Presenting Isaac Hayes, had been a poor seller for the record label Stax Records, and Hayes was about to return to his behind-the-scenes role as a producer and songwriter, when the label suddenly lost its entire back catalog after splitting with Atlantic Records in May 1968.

Stax executive Al Bell decided to release an almost-instant back catalog of 27 albums and 30 singles at once, and ordered all of Stax's artists to record new material, encouraging some of Stax's prominent creative staff, including Hayes and guitarist Steve Cropper, to record solo albums.

After feeling burned by the retail and creative flop of his first album, Hayes told Bell that he would not record a follow-up or any other album unless he was granted complete creative control. Since Bell had encouraged Hayes to record Presenting... in the first place, he readily agreed.

Production
Produced by Al Bell with Allen Jones and Marvell Thomas, the record was tracked by engineer Terry Manning at the Ardent Studios location on National Street in Memphis. The Bar-Kays were the tracking band, supplemented by pianist and co-producer Marvell Thomas (son of Rufus Thomas). Isaac Hayes played Hammond organ and sang the vocals live while conducting the tracking band at the same time. Much of the later production was done as part of the package of products brought to Detroit by producer Don Davis to expedite the production process. The strings and horns were arranged by Detroit arranger Johnny Allen and were recorded at United Sound Studios by engineer Ed Wolfrum with vocals and final mix at Tera Shirma by engineer Russ Terrana. The producers were looking for a sweeping orchestral sound that would enhance the rhythm tracks. The pre-delay reverberation technique, recorded in part by Terry Manning on the tracking session, had been used at Artie Fields productions in Detroit in late 1950s, and at Columbia Records; it was also used by Wolfrum and others for numerous productions and commercials previous and after the release of this project including the Marvin Gaye What's Going On project, with orchestration also recorded at United. Russ Terrana went on to the engineering staff of Motown Records and was responsible for the recording and mixing of many hits on that label.

Reception

The album was released in June 1969 and peaked at number 1 on the top R&B chart, and at number 8 on the Billboard 200.

Contemporary and retrospective reviews of the album were highly positive. Allmusic ranks Hot Buttered Soul as perhaps the best record of Hayes's career, second only to 1971's Black Moses, and said the album pioneered new developments in R&B music for the 1970s. In 2020, Rolling Stone ranked the album at number 373 in their list of the 500 Greatest Albums of All Time.

American punk rock musician Henry Rollins has frequently referred to Hot Buttered Soul as one of his favorite albums; Rollins interviewed Hayes for his book Do I Come Here Often?

Track listing

Personnel
 Isaac Hayes – vocals, keyboards
 Marvell Thomas – producer, keyboards
 Harold Beane - Guitar solo on "Walk On By"
The Bar-Kays
Willie Hall - drums
James Alexander - bass
Michael Toles - guitar
Technical
 Al Bell – Producer, supervising producer
 Bill Dahl – Liner notes
 Kate Hoddinott – Package redesign
 Allen Jones – Producer
 Johnny Allen - Arranger
 Terry Manning – Engineer
 Bob Smith – Photography
 Joe Tarantino – Mastering
 Russ Terrana – Remixing
 Honeya Thompson – Art direction
 Christopher Whorf  – Cover design
 Ed Wolfrum –	Engineer, mixing

See also
Album era
List of number-one R&B albums of 1969 (U.S.)

References

1969 albums
Isaac Hayes albums
Stax Records albums
Albums produced by Al Bell
Albums produced by Allen Jones (record producer)
Albums produced by Marvell Thomas